Rozeh Khani or Rawda khwani ("reading the Rozeh") is the Shia Iranian Muslim ritual of the Mourning of Muharram. It is held every day of the year to commemorate the death of Husayn ibn Ali and his followers during the Battle of Karbala.

Performance 
Rawda khwani as public lamentation is held to commemorating the death of Husayn ibn Ali and his follower, suffering of his family during the Battle of Karbala especially by Iranian Shia Muslims. During this ritual mourning, the Rawda khwan (story teller) recites loudly chapters of the Garden of the Martyrs with innovative skills to mourners. The ritual of Rawda khwani can be held anywhere, such as public squares of cities and villages, yards of mosque or privet house, Hussainiya and the Tekyeh that were built from the eighteenth century for performing the Mourning of Muharram.  At first, this ritual mourning was held through the first ten days of the month of Muḥarram and then Rawda was commemorated in Muharram and Safar but nowadays every day of the year it is held.
In the 19th century, by the time of the Qajar dynasty Rawda khwani had been used by actors of the Ta'zieh.

The origin place of Rawda was Iran, but then at Bahrain this ritual is seen in its original form and at other places like India, the modified form of it is held.

Titled 

The name Rawda khwani initially referred to the reading of Rawḍat al-s̲h̲uhadāʾ, a book composed by Hussain Wa'ez Kashefi in 1502 in Herat. Gradually, the name Rawda (taken from the title of the book) became a common word to denote the recitation of the tragedy of Karbalāʾ.

Rawda khwan (the story tellers) is referred to the person who recites chapters of the Garden of the Martyrs. After a while the story teller strived to gain new techniques and texts to performing the Rawda khwani. When new Maqtal al-Husayn books (various books which narrate the story of the battle of Karbala and the death of Hussain ibn Ali) were authored by different writers, the story tellers decided to use these books as texts of recitation of Rawda. Tufan al-Buka (tempest of tear) of Muhammad Ibrahim Jawhari, Asrar al-shahada (Mysteries of Martyrdom) of Ali Asghar Tabatabai are the most popular books that are replaced as Rawḍat al-s̲h̲uhadā.

See also
Marsia
Noha
Soaz
Ta'zieh
Hussainia
Hosay

References

Arabic poetry
Shia literature
Mourning of Muharram
Persian poetry